Ramaria vinosimaculans, commonly known as the wine-staining coral, is a coral mushroom in the family Gomphaceae. It is found in North America.

References

Gomphaceae
Fungi described in 1974
Edible fungi
Fungi of North America